Kenny Gales is a former professional American football player. Gales was drafted in the sixth round of the 1995 NFL Draft and was a member of the Chicago Bears that season, though he did not see any playing time during a regular season game. Later he played with the Barcelona Dragons of the World League of American Football in 1996.

References

Chicago Bears players
Barcelona Dragons players
American football cornerbacks
Wisconsin Badgers football players
1972 births
Living people